is a Japanese actor. In 1964, Hiraizumi joined Daiei Film company and started his acting career.
In the 1970s to early 1980s, he appeared in a lot of jidaigeki and detective television dramas as a guest villain actor.

Hiraizumi starred as Koichi Matsudo in L: Change the WorLd and he also starred in Osaka Tough Guys.

Filmography

Film
 Daimajin Okoru (1966)
 Nemuri Kyōshirō Burai Hikae (1967)
 The Snake Girl and the Silver-Haired Witch (1968)
 Yakuza Zessyō (1970)
 Ryoma Ansatsu (1974)
 Tokyo Blackout (1987)
 Violent Cop (1989)
 Edo Jō Tairan (1991)
Like a Rolling Stone (1994)
 Osaka Tough Guys (1995)
 Haru (1996)
 Hana and Alice (2004)
 Nobody Knows (2004)
 Chameleon (2008)
 L: Change the WorLd (2008)
 Gold Medal Man (2016)
 Shin Godzilla (2016)
 Weathering with You (2019), Detective Yasui (voice)
 189 (2021)
 Soul at Twenty (2022)
 My Small Land (2022)
 Thousand and One Nights (2022)

Television
 Nantatte 18 sai! (1971)
 Taiyō ni Hoero! (1972–86, episodes 17, 375, 413, 509, 526, 540, 587, 643, and 684)
 Fireman (1973)
 G-Men '75 (1975–81, episodes 10, 72, 78, 93, 129, 141, 161, 188, 212, 225, 241,253, and 338)
 Daitokai Tatakaino Hibi  (1976)
 Ōgon no Hibi (1978) – Shimazu Yoshihiro
 Tokugawa Ieyasu (1983) – Ii Naomasa
 Oshin (1983) - Nakagawa Gunji
 Sukeban Deka (1985) - Jūzō Numa
 Choushinsei Flashman (1986, 1 episode) - Kazuo's father
 Kumokiri Nizaemon (1995) – Okada
 The Family (2007)
Kaseifu no Mita (2011)
 Amachan (2013)
 Ultraman R/B (2018) - Kumajo Matsuo
 Idaten (2019) – Ōkuma Shigenobu
 Reach Beyond the Blue Sky (2021) – Shibusawa Sōsuke

References

External links
 
 https://web.archive.org/web/20110722101548/http://info.movies.yahoo.co.jp/detail/typs/id119631/

1944 births
Living people
Japanese male actors
People from Okazaki, Aichi